Paul Dätwyler (13 March 1916 – 25 July 1984) was a Swiss wrestler. He competed at the 1936 Summer Olympics and the 1948 Summer Olympics.

References

External links
 

1916 births
1984 deaths
Swiss male sport wrestlers
Olympic wrestlers of Switzerland
Wrestlers at the 1936 Summer Olympics
Wrestlers at the 1948 Summer Olympics
Place of birth missing
20th-century Swiss people